Kota District is a district of the state of Rajasthan in western India. The city of Kota is the administrative headquarters of the district.

During the period around 12th century AD, Rao Deva, a Hada Chieftain conquered the territory and founded Bundi and Hadoti.  In the early 17th century AD, during the reign of the Mughal Emperor Jahangir, the ruler of Bundi, Rao Ratan Singh, gave the smaller principality of Kota to his son, Madho Singh. Since then Kota became a hallmark of the Rajput gallantry and culture. In Pre-Independence days social activist Guru Radha Kishan worked here along with other prominent freedom fighters and organised people against the government's policies. He left Kota after the local administration learned of the arrest warrant issued against him for his activities for freedom movement.

The district is bounded on the north by Bundi District, on the east by Baran District, on the south by Jhalawar District, and on the west by Chittorgarh District and Mandsaur District. It is renowned for its IIT JEE preparation as well as medical exams preparation . It is now the hub of educational institutions and is home to Asia's biggest manufacturer of fertilizer.

Further, Kota is surrounded by four power stations within its 50 km radius. First is Rajasthan atomic power plant which is an atomic power plant and is very near to Kota at a place called Rawatbhata and is situated at a place called Rawatbhata in the Chittorgarh District. Second is Kota Thermal Power plant which generates power from coal and is situated at the bank of Chambal river and is within Kota city. Third is Anta Gas Power plant which generates power from gas and is situated at a place called Anta in the Baran District. and the fourth is Jawahar Sagar Power plant which is hydraulic power plant.

Demographics
According to the 2011 census Kota district has a population of 1,951,014, roughly equal to the nation of Lesotho or the US state of New Mexico. This gives it a ranking of 239th in India (out of a total of 640). Its population growth rate over the decade 2001-2011 was  24.35%. Kota has a sex ratio of 906 females for every 1000 males, and a literacy rate of 77.48%. 60.31% of the population lives in urban areas. Scheduled Castes and Scheduled Tribes make up 20.78% and 9.42% of the population respectively.

Languages

At the time of the 2011 census, 48.32% of the population spoke Hadauti, 39.42% Hindi, 3.58% Rajasthani, 2.26% Malvi, 1.94% Urdu and 1.12% Sindhi as their first language.

Newspapers
Dainik Bhaskar
Rajasthan Patrika

See also
Keshavpura
Panahera
Ramganj Mandi
Kota Stone Industry

References

External links 

 Official website

 
Districts of Rajasthan
Districts in Kota division